Stuff You Should Know is a free podcast and video series published by HowStuffWorks and hosted by Josh Clark and Charles W. "Chuck" Bryant, both writers at HowStuffWorks. The podcast educates listeners on a wide variety of topics, often using popular culture as a reference giving the podcast comedic value. Episodes are normally around 45 minutes in length, although for more in-depth topics the show has run longer than an hour.

The winner of the 2014 and the 2016 People's Voice Webby Award, the show is downloaded more than 1 million times per week and is consistently on iTunes’ Top 10 podcast rankings.  Stuff You Should Know's "beautifully, beautifully done" production has set "the audio standard," according to podcast reviewers Pod on Pod.  They added that the audio quality "could not be improved" on the NPR-level production.  One reviewer said of it: "It is never not fun to listen to."

Since 2014, a listener and fan, dubbed The Minister of Stats by Clark and Bryant, has maintained a spreadsheet listing all episodes with original publishing dates, run times, and fun facts. Short Stuff and Selects episodes do not contribute to the overall episode count.

Series overview

Episodes

2008

2009

2010

2011

2012

2013

2014

2015

2016

2017

2018

2019

2020

2021

References
Due to a size limit, some references are shown in a shortened form. See the year articles for the full references.

External links
Podcast Archive

Lists of radio series episodes
Lists of podcast episodes